This is a list of Danish television related events from 1978.

Events
25 February - Mabel are selected to represent Denmark at the 1978 Eurovision Song Contest with their song "Boom Boom". They are selected to be the eleventh Danish Eurovision entry during Dansk Melodi Grand Prix held at the Tivolis Koncertsal in Copenhagen.

Debuts

Television shows
Draculas ring (October 15 to October 21)

Ending this year

Births
7 January - Sami Darr, actress
25 January - Signe Muusmann, TV & radio host
6 June - Louise Wolff, journalist & TV host
13 September - Morten Resen, TV host
14 October - Jacob Riising, actor & TV host
22 October - Cecilie Hother, weathergirl
1 November - Lise Rønne, journalist & TV host

Deaths

See also
1978 in Denmark